In engineering, RAMS (reliability, availability, maintainability and safety) is used to characterize a product or system:    
 Reliability – as ability to perform a specific function and may be given as design reliability or operational reliability.
 Availability, – as ability to keep a functioning state in the given environment.
 Maintainability – as ability to be timely and easily maintained (including servicing, inspection and check, repair and/or modification).
 Safety – as ability not to harm people, the environment, or any assets during a whole life cycle.

Systems engineering
Dependability
Failure mode
Failure rate
Failure mode, effects, and criticality analysis (FMECA)
Hazard analysis and critical control points
High availability
Risk assessment
Reliability-centered maintenance
Safety instrumented system
Safety integrity level
Reliability, availability and serviceability (RAS)
Fault injection

References

Reliability engineering